David Sherrington (born 1 September 1961) is a former English cricketer.  Sherrington was a right-handed batsman who played primarily as a wicketkeeper.  He was born in Easington, County Durham.

Sherrington represented the Durham Cricket Board in 3 List A matches in the 1999 NatWest Trophy against Oxfordshire, Staffordshire and Gloucestershire.  In his 3 List A matches, he batted once, scoring an unbeaten 2 runs.  Behind the stumps he took 4 catches and made a single stumping.

References

External links
David Sherrington at Cricinfo
David Sherrington at CricketArchive

1961 births
Living people
Sportspeople from Easington, County Durham
Cricketers from County Durham
English cricketers
Durham Cricket Board cricketers
Wicket-keepers
Fellows of the American Physical Society